Meghimatium fruhstorferi is a species of medium to large air-breathing land slug, a terrestrial pulmonate gastropod mollusc in the family Philomycidae and the superfamily Arionacea, the roundback slugs.

Distribution
Its distribution is Japan and Taiwan. Its Japanese name is ヤマナメクジ and Chinese name is 山蛞蝓.

Subspecies:
 Meghimatium fruhstorferi daiseniana (Cockerell)

References

Further reading 
 Chang N. S., Jeong K. H. & Kim Y. U. (1995). "Morphological and histochemical studies on the hermaphroditic and male reproductive organs of a Korean slug Incilaria fruhstorferi". Korean J. Malacol. 11: 78-91.

External links 
 
 

Philomycidae
Molluscs of Japan
Invertebrates of Taiwan
Gastropods described in 1901
Taxa named by Walter Collinge